Joyce Hiller Piven (born February 21, 1930) is an American director, teacher, and actress. She and her late husband, Byrne Piven, were actors in the Compass Players. Later, they founded the Piven Theatre Workshop in Evanston, Illinois and became teachers to a generation of stars such as John Cusack, Joan Cusack, Aidan Quinn, Adam McKay, as well as their son Jeremy Piven and daughter Shira Piven.

She used to teach and direct at the Workshop and served as the Artistic Director Emeritus.

Biography
Piven was born Joyce Goldstein. In 1954, she met Byrne Piven at the University of Chicago. They wed a short time later. 
They had their first child, Shira Piven, in 1961, and later had their second child, Jeremy Piven, in 1965. 
After the death of her husband, Byrne Piven, in 2002, she continued to reside and teach in Evanston, and eventually moved to Los Angeles in 2017 to be with her children and grandchildren.

Career
In the 1950s, the Pivens were two of the founding members of the Playwrights Theatre Club, along with Paul Sills and David Shepard.

Playwrights featured such budding stars as Mike Nichols, Elaine May, Ed Asner, and Barbara Harris.  They later formed the Compass Players which was a forerunner to The Second City.

In 1970, Joyce and Byrne Piven founded the Piven Theater Workshop. Based in Evanston Illinois, the Workshop was founded with the goal of teaching acting through theater and improvisation games. The technique was relatively new at the time, with Joyce and Byrne having been mentored by Theater Game Theorist Viola Spolin, and continuing the practice in their individual work as well as through the workshop.

Joyce continued to direct and teach within the workshop until 2017, when she moved to Los Angeles to be with her children and grandchildren. She now teaches local theater intensives and courses, and privately coaches actors.

Published work

References

External links
 

Jewish American actresses
American stage actresses
Living people
Place of birth missing (living people)
1930 births
University of Chicago alumni
21st-century American Jews
21st-century American women